Events from the year 1801 in Denmark.

Incumbents
 Monarch – Christian VII
 Prime minister – Christian Günther von Bernstorff

Events

 3 March – Battle of West Kay: the Danish brig  is attacked by two British vessels at West Kay in the Danish West Indies.
 2 April – The Battle of Copenhagen takes place.
 9 April – A meeting between Crown Prince Frederik and Vice Admiral Lord Nelson at Amalienborg Palace results in a ceasefire. Denmark has to leave the neutrality pact.
 6 July – The first vaccination against smallpox in Denmark is made, using the method invented by Edward Jenner.

Undated
 Exercise is for the first time introduced in the curriculum of a state school in Denmark.

Births
 14 June – Peter Wilhelm Lund, natural scientist (died 1880)
 24 June – Jørgen Valentin Sonne, painter (died 1890)
 13 October – Søren Hjorth, railway pioneer and inventor (died 1870)

Deaths
 21 January – Peter Christian Abildgaard, scientist (born 1740)
 Elisabeth Christine Berling, businessperson (born 1744)

References

 
1800s in Denmark
Years of the 19th century in Denmark